Konstanty Maria Sopoćko (1903-1992) was a Polish artist, specializing in woodcutting. He created posters, advertisements, logos, bookplates and illustrations. He lectured at the Academy of Fine Arts in Warsaw.

References
 KONSTANTY MARIA SOPOĆKO

1903 births
1992 deaths
Academic staff of the Academy of Fine Arts in Warsaw